Odum may refer to:

People
 Bernard Odum (1932-2004), American bass guitar player 
 Ernest J. Odum (187–1919), American lawyer and politician
 Ethma Odum (1931-2009), American television personality with KALB-TV
 Eugene Odum  (1913-2002), American ecologist
 George Odum (born 1993), American football player
 Howard T. Odum (1924–2002), American ecologist
 Howard W. Odum (1884-1954), American sociologist
 Igwegbe Odum (late 1800s-1940), Nigerian politician
 Jake Odum (born 1991), American basketball player and coach
 Joseph R. Odum (1913-1942), United States Navy sailor and Silver Star recipient
 Kasper Ødum (born 1979), Danish badminton player

Other
 Odum, Georgia, a town in the state of Georgia in the United States
 USS Odum (APD-71), U.S. Navy high-speed transport 
 The Ghanaian name for the iroko, an African hardwood tree

See also
 Odom, a surname